Archibugi is a surname. Notable people with the surname include:

Daniele Archibugi (born 1958), Italian economic and political theorist
Francesca Archibugi (born 1960), Italian film director and scriptwriter
Franco Archibugi (1926–2020), Italian economist

Surnames of Italian origin